Typhloseiella is a genus of mites in the Phytoseiidae family.

Species
 Typhloseiella isotricha (Athias-Henriot, 1958)
 Typhloseiella perforatus (Wainstein, 1980)

References

Phytoseiidae